This article provides details of international football games played by the El Salvador national football team from 1950 to 1955.

1950

1953

1954

1955

Head-to-head results

References 

El Salvador national football team